Garúa is a Spanish word meaning drizzle or mist.  Although used in other contexts in the Spanish-speaking world, garúa most importantly refers to the moist cold fog that blankets the coasts of Peru, southern Ecuador, and northern Chile, especially during the southern hemisphere winter. In Chile, a similar fog is called camanchaca. Garúa brings mild temperatures and high humidity to a tropical coastal desert.  It also provides moisture from fog and mist to a nearly-rainless region and permits the existence of vegetated fog oases, called lomas.

While fog and drizzle are common in many coastal areas around the world, the prevalence and persistence of garúa and its impact on climate and the environment make it unique.

Formation
Between those latitudes, the Humboldt Current hugs the coastline bringing mild temperatures and high humidity to a hyper-arid region. The cold waters of the Humboldt create an inversion, the air near the ocean surface being cooler than the air above, contrary to most climatic situations. The trade winds blow the cool air and fog westward over coastal areas, where the fog coalesces into drizzle and mist, the garúa.

Garúa is a dense fog that does not produce rain. The water droplets in the fog measure between 1 and 40 microns across, too fine to form rain.

Impact on climate
The impact of the Humboldt Current and the garúa it produces is substantial.

The impact on sunshine is even more substantial.  Annually, only 34 percent of daylight hours in Lima have sunshine.  On average, July and August receive less than one hour a day of sunshine. Lima receives only 1,230 hours of sunshine annually.  By contrast, London, notoriously cloudy and foggy, gets 1,573 hours of sunshine annually and New York City receives 2,535 hours of sunshine annually.  The climate of Lima is typical of the coasts of Peru and northern Chile.

The omnipresent garúa clouds and mist in winter in Lima led the nineteenth-century American author, Herman Melville to call Lima “the strangest, saddest city thou cans’t see.” (Twenty-first century Lima, however, has a flourishing tourist trade and has been described as having a "hidden loveliness.")   
 
Only the moisture condensed from the garùa clouds -- plus occasional El Niño events -- enables islands of vegetation to be present in the lomas dotted up and down the Peruvian and Chilean coasts. Except for the lomas and river valleys draining the higher and more humid Andes the coastal desert is almost completely barren of vegetation.

Fog collection 
 
In a water-scarce desert land, water is being captured from the moisture-laden garúa. In Chile, in 1985, scientists devised a fog collection system of polyolefin netting to capture the water droplets in the fog to produce running water for villages in these otherwise desert areas. The Camanchacas Project installed 50 large fog-collecting nets on a mountain ridge, which captured some 2% of the water in the fog. 

In Peru, as part of an effort to preserve the fragile ecosystem of the garúa-watered lomas, conservation groups have installed fog-catching nets in the Atiquipa District to capture water and help the 80 families who live within the area to expand agriculture, primarily of olives.

References

See also

 Fog
 Geography of Peru

Cloud types
Geography of Peru
Geography of Chile
Deserts of Peru
Climate of Chile
Precipitation